Felician may refer to:

People
Primus and Felician, Christian saints
Felician of Foligno, Christian saint  
Saint Felician, a companion of St. Victor of Marseilles
Felicianus of Musti, 4th-century bishop
Felician, Archbishop of Esztergom
Felician Záh, Hungarian assassin

Other
Felician College
Felician Sisters, whose name derives from Felix of Cantalice

See also
Feliciano (disambiguation)
Félicien
Felix (disambiguation)